The 2011 elections for elected officials in Los Angeles took place on March 8, 2011. Seven out of the fifteen members of the city council were up for election.

Results
Officially all candidates are non-partisan. *Incumbent.

City council
 

 

District 2

District 4

District 6

District 8

District 10

District 12

District 14

References

External links
 Office of the City Clerk, City of Los Angeles

Los Angeles
2011
Los Angeles